Alan Craig Thompson (May 17, 1927 – July 28, 2019) was an American politician and journalist in the state of Washington. He served in the Washington House of Representatives from 1965 to 1982 and the Washington State Senate from 1982 to 1986, as a Democrat. He was appointed to the Senate in November 1982 to replace the deceased Don Talley. He was also the Chief Clerk of the Washington House of Representatives from 1987 to 1993.

References

2019 deaths
1927 births
People from Franklin County, Iowa
Democratic Party Washington (state) state senators
Democratic Party members of the Washington House of Representatives